There were two serials released in the 1940s pertaining to the character Batman:
Batman (serial) from 1943
Batman and Robin (serial) from 1949